Fatma Sultan ("One who abstains"; 1606, Topkapi Palace, Constantinople, – 1670, Constantinople) was an Ottoman princess. She was the daughter of Sultan Ahmed I (r. 1603–1617) and Kösem Sultan, sister of Murad IV (r. 1623–1640) and Ibrahim (r. 1640–1648), and the paternal aunt of Mehmed IV (r. 1648–1687). She is known for her many political marriages.

Life
The year of her birth has been suggested as 1606. 
She lived in Topkapi Palace until his father's death in 1617, when she had to follow her mother and sisters to Eski Saray. She returned to court in 1623, when her younger brother Murad IV became the new sultan.

Marriages
The Ottoman princesses were normally married away, to influential Ottoman officials, by their mothers or paternal grandmothers, who had the right to arrange their marriages and arranged matches which could be of political use. They had privileges in marriage which separated them from other Muslim females: such as the right to be the only wife of their spouse, to refuse to consummate their marriage until they were ready and to contract a divorce when they pleased. Due to many of them marrying as children and being widowed and divorced several times, often for political reasons, remarriages were very common. Fatma Sultan and her sister, Ayşe Sultan, are extreme examples of this: they were married at least seven times each, and entered into their last engagement at the ages of 61 and 50, respectively.

First marriage 
During the reign of her brother Sultan Murad IV, Fatma Sultan married Kara Mustafa Pasha in 1623.   She was widowed in 1628, when Kara Mustafa Pasha was executed by her brother, Murad, for some action "contrary to the law of God."

Second, third and fourth marriage 
Upon the execution of her first husband, she married Sarrac Çatalcalı Hasan Pasha.  After the death of her second husband, she married Canbuladzade Mustafa Pasha. He was executed by the orders of her brother, Murad in 1635–6.   After the death of her third spouse, Fatma Sultan married Koca Yusuf Pasha.

In 1643, early in the reign of her brother Sultan Ibrahim, Fatma is recorded, like her sisters Ayşe Sultan and Hanzade Sultan, as receiving the maximum daily stipend for imperial princesses of the time, namely 400 aspers.   In 1647, the three of them as well as their niece, Murad's daughter Kaya Sultan, were subjected, on what was another assault of the protocol on Ibrahim's part, to the indignity of subordination to his concubines. He took away their lands and jewels (presumably to award them to his Hasekis), and made them serve Hümaşah Sultan, the concubine he married, by standing at attention like servants while she ate and fetching and holding the soap, basin and pitcher of water with which she washed her hands.   Because of what he believed was failure to serve his beloved Hümaşah properly, the Sultan then banished them to Edirne Palace.

Fifth marriage 

One of the most noted of the seven marriages of Fatma was her marriage to Melek Ahmed Pasha, previously married to her niece, Kaya Sultan, in 1662.  By that time, she was in her late fifties. The marriage was forcibly arranged against the wishes of both parties, and unhappy, and Melek Ahmed Pasha accused the Grand Vizier Köprülü Mehmed Pasha of having arranged it to punish him. The Grand Vizier himself joked that he had given Melek Ahmed Pasha an elephant to feed. 

On the wedding night, Fatma presented Melek Ahmed Pasha her demand of what allowance she wished for herself and her court. He replied that the amount was impossible, upon which she replied that divorce was the only alternative, and demanded he return her dowry to her, which amounted to one year of taxes of Egypt (this was possibly related to the fact that one of her previous husbands, the late Kara Mustafa Pasha, had formerly been a governor of the Egypt province of the Ottoman Empire and was reported to have been forced to pay back the tax proceeds that he had embezzled during his term). 

When she was widowed in 1662 shortly thereafter, she sealed his residence and claimed the right to his property, which caused a conflict with the Grand Vizier, who was forced to give in to her demands.

Sixth and seventh marriage 
In June 1663, Fatma Sultan married Vezir Kanbur Mustafa Pasha, the Beylerbeyi of Baghdad.  After his death in 1666, she married the Beylerbeyi of Silistre Vezir Közbekçi Yusuf Pasha on 5 September 1667.

Issue
Fatma had a son by her second marriage: 
Sultanzade Hasan Bey (1629/1630 - ?). He died in infancy. 

Fatma Sultan had two sons by her third marriage:
Sultanzade Canbuladzade Hüseyn Paşah (1633 - 16 February 1680). Governor of Buda and Cairo. He married his cousin Ayşe Sultan, a daughter of Sultan Ibrahim I. 
Sultanzade Canbuladzade Süleyman Bey (1635 - After 1665).

Death
Fatma Sultan died in 1670. She is buried in the mausoleum of her father Ahmed, in the Sultan Ahmed Mosque, Istanbul.

Charity
Fatma Sultan built a fountain on the road around the Ahmed Paşa Mosque in Topkapı.

In popular culture  
In the 2016 TV series Muhteşem Yüzyıl: Kösem, Fatma is portrayed by Turkish actress Balim Gaye Bayrak.

See also
 List of Ottoman Princesses

References

Bibliography

External links 
 Gendered Domains: Rethinking Public and Private in Women's History : Essays ...Dorothy O. Helly, Susan Reverby
 The Imperial Harem: Women and Sovereignty in the Ottoman Empire. Leslie P. Peirce
 Evliya Çelebi: The Intimate Life of an Ottoman Statesman, Melek Ahmed Pasha (1588-1662)
 https://web.archive.org/web/20140520045725/http://www.uskudar.bel.tr/tr-tr/hizmet/rehber/sayfalar/Rehber-Detay-Icerik.aspx?GuideID=10&SubID=80&ContentID=19280

1606 births
17th-century Ottoman princesses